Maragha (also Maraga) or Shikharkh, formerly known as Leninavan (between 1954–1992), is a town in the Tartar District of Azerbaijan, in the disputed region of Nagorno-Karabakh. The town had an ethnic Armenian-majority population in 1989, which had the status of a village at the time. The town was the site of a large massacre during the First Nagorno-Karabakh War.

History 
During the Soviet period, the village was a part of the Mardakert District of the Nagorno-Karabakh Autonomous Oblast.

First Nagorno-Karabakh War 

On 10 April 1992, during the First Nagorno-Karabakh War, the village, known as Leninavan by then, was the scene of a massacre of ethnic Armenians by Azerbaijani forces, which has been described as an act of revenge after the Khojaly Massacre.

Population

References

External links 
 

Populated places in Tartar District
Nagorno-Karabakh